Luis Arturo Montes Jiménez (born 15 May 1986), also known as Chapito, is a Mexican professional footballer who plays as a midfielder for Chilean Primera División club Everton.

Club career
Montes started his career playing for Pachuca's youth team. When he was 19 years old, he was loaned out to second-tier Indios de Ciudad Juárez.

Montes made his professional debut on January 8, 2006, in a league game against Irapuato, entering the game as a substitute for Luis Esqueda in the 79th minute in the Olimpico Benito Juarez Stadium.

Montes returned to Pachuca for the Clausura 2007 tournament and remained at the team through the Clausura 2011 tournament. He played 86 official league games for the first team, plus 25 international games in the Copa Sudamericana, CONCACAF Champions League, Club World Cup, Copa Libertadores and the now-defunct North American SuperLiga.

At the start of the 2011–12 season, Montes was transferred to, then second division side, Club Léon  on a yearlong loan. He became an important first team player, playing a total of 38 games between the Apertura 2011 and the Clausura 2012 Tournaments. Club Léon clinched the Liga de Ascenso title, now Ascenso MX, and the promotion to the Primera Division.

International career
Montes made his senior national team debut as a second-half substitute in a goalless friendly with Peru on 17 April 2013. He was selected by coach José Manuel de la Torre to participate in the 2013 CONCACAF Gold Cup held in the United States, and scored his first international goal on his third Mexico appearance, in a 3–1 win over Martinique in the group stage of the Gold Cup on 14 July.

Montes was selected in October 2013 by new coach Miguel Herrera to dispute the Intercontinental play-off between Mexico and New Zealand in which he played both games and helped Mexico qualify to the 2014 FIFA World Cup. Luis Montes received his first call up in 2014, in Mexico's first game in 2014 against South Korea. Eventually Montes was called up to be in Mexico's squad for the 2014 World Cup along with teammates, Carlos Peña, José Vázquez, and Rafael Márquez.

On 31 May 2014, in a friendly match against Ecuador two minutes after scoring a long range goal, Montes suffered a double fracture [tibia and fibula] in a challenge with Segundo Castillo. Due to the injury Montes missed the 2014 FIFA World Cup and did not return to action until 8 February 2015 against UNAM.

On 23 March 2019, Montes returned to international football in a 3–1 victory against Chile after a two-year absence. He also scored Mexico's fourth goal three days later in a 4–2 victory over Paraguay.

Career statistics

International

International goals
Scores and results list Mexico's goal tally first.

Honours
Pachuca
North American SuperLiga: 2007
CONCACAF Champions' Cup: 2008
CONCACAF Champions League: 2009–10

León
Liga MX: Apertura 2013, Clausura 2014, Guardianes 2020
Ascenso MX: Clausura 2012
Leagues Cup: 2021

Mexico
CONCACAF Gold Cup: 2019

Individual
CONCACAF Champions' Cup Top Scorer (Shared): 2008
Liga MX Player of the Month: October 2020
Liga MX Best XI: Clausura 2019, Guardianes 2020
Liga MX Most Valuable Player: Guardianes 2020
Liga MX Best Offensive Midfielder: 2020–21

References

External links
 
 
 
 

1986 births
Living people
Mexican expatriate footballers
Mexico international footballers
Association football midfielders
C.F. Pachuca players
Club León footballers
Liga MX players
People from Ciudad Juárez
Indios de Ciudad Juárez footballers
Everton de Viña del Mar footballers
Chilean Primera División players
Expatriate footballers in Chile
Footballers from Chihuahua
2013 CONCACAF Gold Cup players
2015 Copa América players
2019 CONCACAF Gold Cup players
CONCACAF Gold Cup-winning players
Mexican footballers